is a railway station in Uonuma, Niigata, Japan, operated by East Japan Railway Company (JR East).

Lines

Station layout
The station consists of one ground-level side platform  serving a single bi-directional track. The station is unattended.

History 
Along with the rest of the Tadami Line, the station came under the ownership of the Japanese National Railways (JNR) in 1949, and was absorbed into the JR East network upon the privatization of the JNR on April 1, 1987.

Surrounding area

Hirokami Post Office
Japan National Route 252
Japan National Route 291
Japan National Route 352

See also
 List of railway stations in Japan

References

External links
  Echigo-Hirose Station (JR East)

Railway stations in Niigata Prefecture
Stations of East Japan Railway Company
Railway stations in Japan opened in 1942
Tadami Line